Group 3 consisted of four of the 32 teams entered into the European zone: Belgium, Iceland, Netherlands, and Norway. These four teams competed on a home-and-away basis for one of the 9.5 spots in the final tournament allocated to the European zone, with the group's winner claiming the place in the finals.

Standings

Matches

Notes

External links 
Group 3 Detailed Results at RSSSF

3
1972–73 in Belgian football
1973–74 in Belgian football
1972–73 in Dutch football
1973–74 in Dutch football
1972 in Icelandic football
1973 in Icelandic football
1972 in Norwegian football
1973 in Norwegian football